Gary Balough (born September 16, 1947) is a retired stock car racing driver who competed from 1979 to 1992.

Career
Throughout the 1970s, Balough expanded his racing across the entire East Coast. He moved from Late Models in the Southeast to Dirt Modifieds in the Northeast. Between 1976 and 1978, Gary won the prestigious Syracuse 200 for modifieds. Balough led one lap in his NASCAR Cup career, at the 1981 Talladega 500 where he came from 41st to 1st, only to suffer from an  overheating engine and resulting DNF. In addition to his many short-track wins, Balough also won the 1981 Miller High Life 300 NASCAR Late Model Sportsman race at Charlotte Motor Speedway. Balough beat Dale Earnhardt and Jody Ridley to win the race. Bob Rahilly of RahMoc Racing owned and built the cars and engines for both of these races.

He started an average of 21st place and finished an average of 25th while bringing home a career total of $90,900 ($ when adjusted for inflation). Balough's only DNQ was at the 1991 Daytona 500. 

He served a sentence of 45½ months in jail for drug trafficking; which ended his career along with his marriage. A ride with Harry Ranier's team was in the works along with a sponsorship from Domino's Pizza that would have paid him $750,000 ($ when adjusted for inflation) for having their name appear on his car for 25 races. Balough used many car owners, engine builders and car builders to help Balough become on top of his game.

After his jail sentence expired, Balough still had access to his children and could still practice his hobby of fishing. His first racing event after the end of his jail sentence was a 200-lap "All-Pro" race in Summerville, South Carolina where he earned the pole position and won the race. 

Balough has won more than 1000 races throughout his short-track career and has accumulated more than 20 wins in the All-Pro division.

Balough later wrote an autobiography and was also the subject of a documentary film.

List of achievements
 1968 Florida's Governor's Cup 200 Winner
 1976 Syracuse 200 Winner
 1977 Syracuse 200 Winner
 1978 Syracuse 200 Winner
 1981 Miller High Life 300 Winner
 1980 Snowball Derby Winner
 1980 Syracuse 200 Winner
 1984 All American 400 Winner
 1984 World Crown 300 Winner
 1986 All American 400 Winner
 1986 All-Pro Champion
 1986 Snowball Derby Winner
2015 Inducted into the Northeast Dirt Modified Hall of Fame.

References

External links
 

1947 births
American drug traffickers
American Speed Association drivers
Living people
NASCAR drivers
Racing drivers from Florida
Racing drivers from Miami
Sportspeople from Fort Lauderdale, Florida